The American Telephone & Telegraph Company Building, located in Denmark, a city in Bamberg County, South Carolina was built in 1922.

The Georgian Revival building offers a number of impressive architectural features.  It is a noteworthy example of the important role that telecommunications played in the early 20th century development of the South Carolina Lowcountry. The site was listed in the National Register July 8, 1999.

References

Commercial buildings on the National Register of Historic Places in South Carolina
Colonial Revival architecture in South Carolina
Infrastructure completed in 1922
Buildings and structures in Bamberg County, South Carolina
Telephone exchange buildings
Telecommunications buildings on the National Register of Historic Places
AT&T buildings
National Register of Historic Places in Bamberg County, South Carolina